Alfred Effiong (born 29 November 1984) is a professional footballer who plays as a forward for Maltese club Balzan. Born in Nigeria, he represents the Malta national team.

Club career
On 28 June 2011, Effiong scored on his European debut for Valletta, netting the second in a 3–0 away win over Sammarinese club Tre Fiori in the UEFA Champions League first qualifying round first leg.

International career

Born in Nigeria, Effiong moved to Malta in 2005 and married a local in 2010. In 2014, his club president, Redeno Apap, asked if he would apply for a Maltese passport, which was granted in March 2015.

Later that month, national coach Pietro Ghedin was searching for a new striker after the suspension of Michael Mifsud. Effiong made his senior international debut for Malta on 25 March, replacing Jean Paul Farrugia in the 60th minute of a 0–2 friendly defeat against Georgia at the Mikheil Meskhi Stadium in Tbilisi. On 8 June, he came on for Andrew Cohen in the 60th minute of a home friendly against Lithuania, and 20 minutes later scored his first international goal to seal a 2–0 victory. He scored his second national goal in a 1–1 draw against Estonia in August 2016. His third goal came from a header against Scotland in Malta's 5–1 home defeat in a World Cup qualifier on 4 September 2016.

International goals
Scores and results list Malta's goal tally first.

Honours
Valletta
Maltese Premier League: 2011–12
Maltese Super Cup: 2011
Balzan
 FA Trophy winner in May 2019

References

External links 
 

1984 births
Living people
Association football forwards
People with acquired Maltese citizenship
Maltese footballers
Malta international footballers
Nigerian footballers
Nigerian emigrants to Malta
Negeri Sembilan FA players
Balzan F.C. players
Qormi F.C. players
Marsaxlokk F.C. players
Valletta F.C. players
Maltese Premier League players
Nigerian expatriate footballers
Expatriate footballers in Malta
Nigerian expatriate sportspeople in Malta